Damian Lang (born 3 March 1976) is a former Australian rules footballer who played with Sydney and Carlton in the Australian Football League (AFL). Between his seasons with Sydney and Carlton, Lang played for Port Adelaide in the South Australian National Football League.

Lang played at Wangaratta Football Club in the Ovens & Murray Football League from 2002 to 2005 and kicked 262 goals and was the leading O&MFNL goalkicker in 2003 and 2004.

Notes

External links

Damian Lang's profile at Bluseum

1976 births
Carlton Football Club players
Sydney Swans players
Port Adelaide Magpies players
Port Adelaide Football Club (SANFL) players
Port Adelaide Football Club players (all competitions)
Australian rules footballers from New South Wales
Living people